Rok Lo Aaj Ki Raat Ko is a Pakistani television drama series, aired on Express Entertainment, directed by Farooq Mengal and written by Faizi. It stars Alishba Yousuf, Danish Taimoor, Najiba Faiz and Sajid Hassan in leading roles. The series revolves around Aayla played by Yousuf, who bores of life due to bitterness and hardships in her life.

Plot summary 

Rok Lo Aaj Ki Raat Ko is a tragic love story revolves around myth, death and hope.

Based on the concept of Trout fish, the series revolves around  a girl who hails from Baltistan and later moves to another city, Karachi as she loses faith in family, life and love.

Cast 

 Alishba Yousuf as Ayla
 Sajid Hussain as Ali Sher
 Seemi Pasha
 Danish Taimoor
 Naila Jaffri
 Najiba Faiz
 Suzain Fatima
 Raeed Muhammad Alam
 Ahsan Balaj

References 

Pakistani drama television series